John Wilmar Pérez Muñoz (born 21 February 1970) is a Colombian football (soccer) player.

A central midfielder, effective in winning the ball and passing it forward, Pérez played for the Colombian clubs Independiente Medellín and Deportivo Cali. In 2000, he moved to the Columbus Crew in the United States. After a slow first season in Columbus, Pérez excelled in 2001 while forming the core of a sturdy midfield next to Brian Maisonneuve. He finished the year with 8 goals and 15 assists, earning recognition as the club's Most Valuable Player for the season. In 2002, Pérez experienced a decline in his statistics and playing time, but nonetheless helped the Crew win their first trophy, the Lamar Hunt U.S. Open Cup.

Pérez also represented the Colombia national team and was a participant at the 1992 Summer Olympics, 1997 Copa America, and 1998 FIFA World Cup. He played in all four of Colombia's matches at the Copa America in 1997, but remained on the bench throughout the World Cup the following year.

Honors

Club
Columbus Crew
 Lamar Hunt U.S. Open Cup: 2002

References

1970 births
Living people
Colombian footballers
Colombian expatriate footballers
Colombia international footballers
1998 FIFA World Cup players
1997 Copa América players
2000 CONCACAF Gold Cup players
Independiente Medellín footballers
Deportivo Cali footballers
Columbus Crew players
Footballers at the 1992 Summer Olympics
Olympic footballers of Colombia
Expatriate soccer players in the United States
Categoría Primera A players
Major League Soccer players
Major League Soccer All-Stars
Association football midfielders
Footballers from Medellín